The 1987–88 European Cup was the 33rd season of the European Cup club football tournament. The competition was won for the first time by PSV Eindhoven, who defeated two-time winners Benfica in the final at Neckarstadion in Stuttgart. PSV became the first Dutch team to win the title in 15 years. They also set a record by winning only three matches on their route to the Cup, including no wins from the quarter-final onwards.

Porto, the defending champions, were eliminated by Real Madrid in the second round.

English clubs were still banned, following the Heysel Stadium disaster of 1985, so Everton were denied a place in the competition for the second time in three years.

Bracket

First round

|}
1 Partizani Tirana were disqualified due to the behaviour of their players and officials, including having four players sent off in their first leg.

First leg

Second leg

Neuchâtel Xamax won 6–2 on aggregate.

Bayern Munich won 5–0 on aggregate.

Real Madrid won 3–1 on aggregate.

Porto won 6–0 on aggregate.

Lillestrøm won 5–3 on aggregate.

Bordeaux won 4–0 on aggregate.

Rapid Wien won 7–0 on aggregate.

PSV Eindhoven won 3–2 on aggregate.

Steaua București won 4–2 on aggregate.

Omonia won 1–0 on aggregate.

Rangers won 2–1 on aggregate.

Górnik Zabrze won 3–2 on aggregate.

AGF Aarhus won 4–2 on aggregate.

Partizani were disqualified due to the behaviour of their players and officials, having four players sent off in their first leg. Benfica qualified on a walkover.

Sparta Prague won 10–0 on aggregate.

Anderlecht won 2–1 on aggregate.

Second round

|}

First leg

Second leg

Bayern Munich won 3–2 on aggregate.

Real Madrid won 4–2 on aggregate.

Bordeaux won 1–0 on aggregate.

PSV Eindhoven won 4–1 on aggregate.

Steaua București won 5–1 on aggregate.

Rangers won 4–2 on aggregate.

Benfica won 1–0 on aggregate.

Anderlecht won 3–1 on aggregate.

Quarter-finals

|}

First leg

Second leg

Real Madrid won 4–3 on aggregate.

1–1 on aggregate; PSV Eindhoven won on away goals.

Steaua București won 3–2 on aggregate.

Benfica won 2–1 on aggregate.

Semi-finals

|}

First leg

Second leg

1–1 on aggregate; PSV Eindhoven won on away goals.

Benfica won 2–0 on aggregate.

Final

Top scorers
The top scorers from the 1987–88 European Cup are as follows:

Notes

References

External links

1987–88 All matches – season at UEFA website
European Cup results at Rec.Sport.Soccer Statistics Foundation
 All scorers 1987–88 European Cup according to protocols UEFA

1987–88 in European football
European Champion Clubs' Cup seasons